Quadrature may refer to:

In signal processing:
Quadrature amplitude modulation (QAM), a modulation method of using both an (in-phase) carrier wave and a 'quadrature' carrier wave that is 90° out of phase with the main, or in-phase, carrier
Quadrature phase, oscillations that are said to be in quadrature if they are separated in phase by 90° (/2, or /4)
Quadrature filter, the analytic signal of a real-valued filter
Quadrature phase-shift keying (QPSK), a phase-shift keying of using four quadrate points on the constellation diagram, equispaced around a circle

In mathematics:
 Quadrature (mathematics), drawing a square with the same area as a given plane figure (squaring) or computing that area
 Quadrature of the circle
 Numerical integration is often called 'numerical quadrature' or simply 'quadrature'
 Gaussian quadrature, a special case of numerical integration
 Formerly, a synonym for "integral"
 Integral
 Antiderivative
 Addition in quadrature, combining the magnitude of uncorrelated signals by taking the square root of the sum of their squares

In physics:
 In Optical phase space, quadratures are operators which represent the real and imaginary parts of the complex amplitude; see also in-phase and quadrature components

In astronomy:
 Quadrature (astronomy), the position of a body (moon or planet) such that its elongation is 90° or 270°; i.e., the body-earth-sun angle is 90°

In Hedge-funds:
Quadrature (hedge-fund), the quant hedge-fund created in 2010, in London, England. 

Quadrature may also refer to:
 Quadrature encoder, a device that detects mechanical position changes and direction of movement
 Illusionistic ceiling painting, sometimes called quadrature after the Italian term, quadratura
 La Quadrature du Net (Squaring of the Net in French), a French advocacy group that promotes digital rights and freedoms of citizens
 "Quadrature", a song by Squarepusher from the album Just a Souvenir